The following television stations operate on virtual channel 66 in the United States:

 KFSF-DT in Vallejo, California
 KPXO-TV in Kaneohe, Hawaii
 WFXP in Erie, Pennsylvania
 WGBO-DT in Joliet, Illinois
 WGBP-TV in Opelika, Alabama
 WPXW-TV in Manassas, Virginia
 WSMH in Flint, Michigan
 WUNI in Marlborough, Massachusetts
 WWIW-LD in Raleigh, North Carolina
 WXPX-TV in Brandenton, Florida

The following stations, which are no longer licensed, formerly operated on virtual channel 66:
 WNNB-CD in Beaver, Pennsylvania
 WNYJ-TV in West Milford, New Jersey

References

66 virtual